The European Journal of Philosophy is a peer-reviewed academic journal of philosophy published quarterly by Wiley-Blackwell. It was established by Mark Sacks in 1993 and the current editor-in-chief is Joseph K. Schear.

Editorial Committee 
The current members of the editorial committee for the journal are: 
 Dina Emundts, University of Konstanz, Germany
 Susan James, Birkbeck, University of London, UK
 Christoph Menke, Goethe University, Frankfurt, Germany
 Robert B. Pippin, University of Chicago, USA
 Beate Rössler, University of Amsterdam, The Netherlands
 Robert Stern, University of Sheffield, UK

Notable articles 
The following articles are listed by the journal as its "Top Articles":

References

External links 
 

Philosophy journals
English-language journals
Publications established in 1993
Quarterly journals
Wiley-Blackwell academic journals